Saint-Perreux is a commune in the Morbihan department of Brittany in north-western France. It was named after the Welsh monk, Saint Petroc.

Geography
The river Arz forms most of the commune's western and south-western borders, then flows (at Saint-Jean-la-Poterie) into the Oust, which forms the commune's eastern border.

Demographics
Inhabitants of Saint-Perreux are called in French Perrusiens or Perreusiens.

See also
Communes of the Morbihan department

References

External links
 Mayors of Morbihan Association 

Saintperreux